The Hotel O'Higgins was the oldest hotel in the city of Viña del Mar in Chile's Valparaíso Region, with 270 rooms. It is owned by the municipality and was managed by Panamericana Hoteles until it closed in 2020.

History
The municipality of Viña began its construction in 1931, with a design by the architects Vicente Collovich, Fernando Silva, and Arnaldo Barison.

For several decades, the hotel served as the hostel for artists participating in the Viña del Mar International Song Festival, and until 2006 it was the official lodging for the artists. It was then displaced by new hotels in the city, such as the Sheraton Miramar. Social meetings, events, and international conventions have also been held at the hotel.

After the earthquake of 2010, the hotel refitted one of its main lounges to host shows for the  while it was being repaired. That same year saw the beginning of the hotel's renovation, which included the construction of a convention center within the complex.

The hotel closed in 2020 due to the COVID-19 pandemic. It served as a quarantine site, and later as a shelter for survivors of nearby forest fires.

References

External links
 

Buildings and structures in Valparaíso Region
Hotel buildings completed in 1936
Hotels in Chile